The New York State Comptroller is an elected constitutional officer of the U.S. state of New York and head of the New York state government's Department of Audit and Control. The New York State Comptroller is the highest-paid state auditor or treasurer in the country. Sixty-one individuals have held the office of State Comptroller since statehood. The incumbent is Thomas DiNapoli, a Democrat.

Powers and duties
The State Comptroller is in effect New York's chief fiscal officer. Article V, Section 1, of the New York Constitution requires the State Comptroller "to audit all vouchers before payment and all official accounts", "to audit the accrual and collection of all revenues and receipts", and "to prescribe such methods of accounting as are necessary for the performance of the foregoing duties". Furthermore, the State Constitution vests the safekeeping and protection of all state funds in the State Comptroller, stating: "[t]he payment of any money of the state, or of any money under its control, or the refund of any money paid to the state, except upon audit by the comptroller, shall be void..." In accordance with this constitutional framework, the State Comptroller has broad superintending authority unlike any other state auditor or treasurer in the nation to ensure that state agencies and local governments alike use taxpayer money effectively and efficiently to promote the common good. For example, the State Comptroller:
Serves as sole trustee of the $258.1 billion New York State Common Retirement Fund (value as of March 31, 2021), making the State Comptroller and his or her Department of Audit and Control one of the largest institutional investors in the world;
Administers the New York State and Local Retirement System for public employees, with more than one million members, retirees and beneficiaries and more than 3,000 employers;
Prescribes and maintains the state's accounting system and administers the State’s approximately $16.7 billion payroll;
Reports on the condition of the state's finances;
Manages and issues the state debt;
Reviews state contracts and audits payments to vendors;
Conducts financial, compliance, and performance audits of local governments, state agencies, and public benefit corporations;
Oversees the fiscal affairs of local governments, including New York City, and prescribes uniform systems of accounts, budgets, and financial reports therefor;
Investigates waste, fraud, and abuse of public resources;
Stewards the Justice Court Fund and the Oil Spill Fund;
Functions as custodian of more than $17 billion in unclaimed funds, restoring lost accounts to their rightful owners; and
Holds training conferences and provides technical assistance to improve state and local government operations.

History
In 1776, the New York Provincial Congress appointed an Auditor-General to settle the public accounts. After his resignation, the Council of Appointment appointed an Auditor to succeed. In 1797, the office of the State Comptroller was created by the State Legislature to succeed the State Auditor. The Comptroller was appointed by the Council of Appointment to a one-year term, and could be re-appointed without term limit. In 1800, the Legislature reduced the salary of the Comptroller from $3,000 to $2,500, and Samuel Jones declined to be re-appointed.

Under the Constitution of 1821, the Comptroller was elected by joint ballot of the New York State Legislature to a three-year term. Under the Constitution of 1846, the office became elective by general election, and the Comptroller was elected with the other state cabinet officers in odd years to a two-year term, serving in the second year of the governor in office and the first year of the succeeding governor. The comptroller was elected in 1895 to a three-year term, and subsequently the state officers were elected in even years and served a two-year term concurrently with the governor. In 1926, the responsibilities of the New York State Treasurer were transferred to the Comptroller as the head of the Department of Audit and Control. Since 1938, the comptroller has been elected to a four-year term, like the governor.

New York State Comptrollers

Notes

See also
 New York State Authorities Budget Office
 New York Comptroller election, 2006
 New York Comptroller elections
 New York State Financial Control Board
 New York State Public Authorities Control Board

External links

Department of Audit and Control in the New York Codes, Rules and Regulations
Political Graveyard: NY State Comptrollers

 
New York